Blazing Six Shooters is a 1940 American Western film directed by Joseph H. Lewis and written by Paul Franklin. The film stars Charles Starrett, Iris Meredith, Dick Curtis, Alan Bridge, George Cleveland and Henry Hall. The film was released on April 11, 1940, by Columbia Pictures.

Plot

Cast          
Charles Starrett as Jeff Douglas
Iris Meredith as Janet Kenyon
Dick Curtis as Lash Bender
Alan Bridge as Bert Karsin
George Cleveland as Mark Rawlins
Henry Hall as Dan Kenyon
Bob Nolan as Bob
Stanley Brown as Cassidy
John Tyrrell as Savage
Eddie Laughton as Runyon
Francis Walker as Shorty
Edmund Cobb as Sheriff
Bruce Bennett as Winthrop

References

External links
 

1940 films
1940s English-language films
American Western (genre) films
1940 Western (genre) films
Columbia Pictures films
Films directed by Joseph H. Lewis
American black-and-white films
1940s American films